Habibvand (also Romanized as Ḩabībvand; also known as Habīb, Ḩabībvand-e Soflá, and Mahkī-ye Bālā) is a village in Beshiva Pataq Rural District, in the Central District of Sarpol-e Zahab County, Kermanshah Province, Iran. At the 2006 census, its population was 831, in 190 families.

References 

Populated places in Sarpol-e Zahab County